Tour Blanche (previously known as Tour Aquitaine and as Tour Chartis) is an office skyscraper in Courbevoie, in La Défense, the business district of the Paris metropolitan area.

Built in 1967 by the architectural firm Les Frères Arsène-Henry, it belongs to the first generation of La Défense towers: its height respects the previous standard height, which was 100 m.

Partially renovated in 2004, it was renovated again from July 2012 to March 2014. Led by the Spie Batignolles, the site costs 41 million euros.

It was renamed Tour Blanche in 2014.

Enedis, the main operator of the electricity distribution network in France and a subsidiary of EDF, has occupied it since September 2014.

See also 
 La Défense
 List of tallest buildings and structures in the Paris region
 List of tallest buildings in France

References

External links 
 Tour Blanche

Skyscraper office buildings in France
La Défense
Office buildings completed in 1967
Office buildings completed in 2014
20th-century architecture in France
21st-century architecture in France